Nyit Toon is a 2019 Burmese thriller drama film directed by Lu Min starring Lu Min, Pyay Ti Oo, Eaindra Kyaw Zin, Khine Thin Kyi and Htet Htet Htun. It is an official remake of the 2006 Indian Hindi Language film Taxi No. 9211 which was inspired by the 2002 American film Changing Lanes. The film, produced by Everest Film Production premiered in Myanmar on September 19, 2019.

Cast
Lu Min as Zaw Htet
Pyay Ti Oo as Soe Ya Ko Ko
Eaindra Kyaw Zin as Khin Thet Thet Wai
Khine Thin Kyi as Nandar
Htet Htet Htun as Sandi

References

External links

2019 films
2010s Burmese-language films
Burmese thriller drama films
Films shot in Myanmar
2019 thriller drama films
Remakes of Indian films